Rat Pack Filmproduktion GmbH is a German film production company owned by Constantin Film.

History 
Rat Pack Filmproduktion GmbH was founded by Christian Becker with Anita Schneider, Jürgen Egger, Alexander Rümelin, Catarina Raacke and Constantin Film in January, 2001 in Munich, Germany. Inspired by the "Rat Pack" of the 50s/ 60s, the company logo also consists of curved letters reminiscent of the lettering of the sixties or large casinos. The animated Rat Pack logo in the opening credits of the films, the so-called trademark and brand name of Rat Pack, is thereby completely changed or adapted as a recurring gag for cineastes in each theatrical film to match the type of film. The logo is also used in the films as a gimmick.

Selected films by Rat Pack Film Production 
  (2017) Production Company
 Winnetou (2016, TV film) Production Company
  (2015) Production Company
 Fack ju Göhte (2013) Production Company
 Kalkofes Mattscheibe - Rekalked (2012-2014, TV) Production Company
 Agent Ranjid rettet die Welt (2012) Production Company
 Das Haus der Krokodile (2012) Production Company
  (2012) Production Company
 Vicky and the Treasure of the Gods (2011) Production Company
 We Are the Night (2010) Production Company
 Jerry Cotton (2010) Production Company
 Zeiten ändern Dich (2010) Production Company (co-production)
  (2010) Production Company
 Vicky the Viking (2009) Production Company
 Die Legende von Loch Ness (2010, TV) Production Company
  (2009) Production Company (co-production)
 Mord ist mein Geschäft, Liebling (2009) Production Company
 ProSieben FunnyMovies (2008–2010, TV) Production Company
 Das Wunder von Loch Ness (2008, TV) Production Company
 The Wave (2008) Production Company
 Die ProSieben Märchenstunde (2006–2009, TV) Production Company
 Neues vom WiXXer (2007) Production Company
 Hui Buh (2006) Production Company
 French for Beginners (2006) Production Company (co-production)
 Lotta in Love (2006, TV) Production Company
 Der WiXXer (2004) Production Company
  (2004, TV) Production Company
 Ratten 2 - Sie kommen wieder! (2004, TV) Production Company
 Mädchen Nr. 1 (2003, TV) Production Company
 Nikos (2003, V) Production Company
  (2002, TV) Production Company
 Kubaner küssen besser (2002, TV) Production Company
 Alles getürkt! (2002, TV) Production Company
 Kalkofes Mattscheibe (2001–2009, TV) Production Company

References

External links 
 IMDB entry for Rat Pack
 Homepage

Film distributors of Germany
Film production companies of Germany
Mass media in Munich